This page lists all massacres occurring in Yemen, both before and after statehood.

List

References 

 AList of massacres in Yemen
massacres
Yemen
Massacres